Maximilian Ziegelbauer (6 September 1923 – 21 November 2016) was a German prelate of the Catholic Church. Ziegelbauer was born in Memmingen, Germany, and was ordained a priest on 21 May 1950. He was appointed auxiliary bishop of the Augsburg Diocese on 2 August 1983 as well as titular bishop of Lapda, and consecrated on 22 October 1983. Ziegelbauer retired from the Augsburg diocese on 7 September 1998.

References

External links
Catholic-Hierarchy
Diocese site (German)

20th-century German Roman Catholic bishops
German Roman Catholic titular bishops
1923 births
2016 deaths
Auxiliary bishops
20th-century German Roman Catholic priests